Ayancheri  is a village situated at the Vadakara Taluk in Kozhikode district in the state of Kerala, India. It has become now a small business hut among the nearest villages. The main business centre is at Katameri Road. Ayancheri is the main transit town from Vatakara to Kuttiady and other surrounding villages.This is the main reason worked behind the fast development of Ayancheri.It is one of the main villages in vatakara taluk

Transportation
Ayancheri village connects to other parts of India through Vatakara city on the west and Kuttiady town on the east.  National highway No. 17 passes through Vatakara and the northern stretch connects to Mangalore, Goa and Mumbai.  The southern stretch connects to Cochin and Trivandrum.  The eastern Highway  going through Kuttiady connects to Mananthavady, Mysore and Bangalore. The nearest airports are at Kannur and Kozhikode.  The nearest railway station is at Vatakara. Ayancheri has a same distance to the nearby towns Kuttiady, Nadapuram, Vatakara and Kakkattil

Demographics
 India census, Ayancheri had a population of 25446 with 12611 males and 12835 females.
http://commons.wikimedia.org/wiki/File:Thazhe_Komath_Sri_Durga_Bhagavathy_Temple_Ayancheri_And_Komath_Tharavadu.pdf

References 

2. Smart Ayanchery

Vatakara area